Mabo is an arrondissement in Kaffrine Department, Kaffrine Region, Senegal.

References 

Arrondissements of Senegal